Harrison Township, Ohio, may refer to:

Harrison Township, Carroll County, Ohio
Harrison Township, Champaign County, Ohio
Harrison Township, Darke County, Ohio
Harrison Township, Gallia County, Ohio
Harrison Township, Hamilton County, Ohio
Harrison Township, Henry County, Ohio
Harrison Township, Knox County, Ohio
Harrison Township, Licking County, Ohio
Harrison Township, Logan County, Ohio
Harrison Township, Montgomery County, Ohio
Harrison Township, Muskingum County, Ohio
Harrison Township, Paulding County, Ohio
Harrison Township, Perry County, Ohio
Harrison Township, Pickaway County, Ohio
Harrison Township, Preble County, Ohio
Harrison Township, Ross County, Ohio
Harrison Township, Scioto County, Ohio
Harrison Township, Van Wert County, Ohio
Harrison Township, Vinton County, Ohio

Ohio township disambiguation pages